Habbupur is a village in Akorhi Gola block of Rohtas district in Bihar, India. As of 2011, its population was 1,247, in 210 households. It covers an area of 141.7 hectares, of which  most is under agricultural use: 118.9 hectares are farmland, all of which is irrigated, and the remaining 22.8 hectares are under non-agricultural use.

References 

Villages in Rohtas district